Kjell Kristiansen (19 March 1925 – 19 September 1999) was a Norwegian footballer. He played in 26 matches for the Norway national football team from 1952 to 1959. He was also named in Norway's squads for the 1952 Summer Olympics and the Group 1 qualification tournament for the 1954 FIFA World Cup.

References

External links
 
 

1925 births
1999 deaths
Norwegian footballers
Norway international footballers
People from Asker
Association football forwards
Asker Fotball players